Bore is a village in Klepp municipality in Rogaland county, Norway. The village lies between the river Figgjoelva, the lake Orrevatnet, and the seashore. Bore Church sits just north of the river, just outside of the village. The Bore area is well known for its sandy beaches along the seashore.

References

Villages in Rogaland
Klepp